Jalan Parit Yusuf, Federal Route 85, is a federal road in Johor, Malaysia. The 15.1 km (9.4 mi) road connects Parit Tengah in the north to Pekan Baru Parit Yusuf in the south.

Route background
The Kilometre Zero of the Federal Route 85 is located at Pekan Baru Parit Yusuf, at its interchange with the Federal Route 5, the main trunk road of the west coast of Peninsular Malaysia.

Features
At most sections, the Federal Route 85 was built under the JKR R5 road standard, allowing maximum speed limit of up to 90 km/h.

List of junctions and towns (south–north)

References

Malaysian Federal Roads